Peter Ladhams (born 14 January 1998) is an Australian rules footballer who plays for the Sydney Swans in the Australian Football League (AFL).

AFL Career

Port Adelaide (2017–2021)  
After spending his first two seasons playing in the SANFL, Ladhams made his debut against  in Round 10 of the 2019 AFL season. He kicked his first goal and behind in that game against .

Sydney (2022–present) 

Statistics
Updated to the end of the 2022 season.

|-
| 2019 ||  || 38
| 5 || 2 || 2 || 32 || 41 || 73 || 9 || 10 || 74 || 0.4 || 0.4 || 6.4 || 8.2 || 14.6 || 1.8 || 2.0 || 14.8 || 0
|-
| 2020 ||  || 38
| 10 || 6 || 2 || 60 || 72 || 132 || 21 || 19 || 124 || 0.6 || 0.2 || 6.0 || 7.2 || 13.2 || 2.1 || 1.9 || 12.4 || 2
|-
| 2021 ||  || 38
| 17 || 13 || 5 || 129 || 102 || 231 || 58 || 40 || 228 || 0.8 || 0.3 || 7.6 || 6.0 || 13.6 || 3.4 || 2.4 || 13.4 || 0
|-
| 2022 ||  || 19
| 11 || 2 || 4 || 82 || 81 || 163 || 29 || 16 || 226 || 0.2 || 0.4 || 7.5 || 7.4 || 14.8 || 2.6 || 1.5 || 20.5 ||
|- class=sortbottom
! colspan=3 | Career
! 43 !! 23 !! 13 !! 303 !! 296 !! 599 !! 117 !! 85 !! 652 !! 0.5 !! 0.3 !! 7.0 !! 6.9 !! 13.9 !! 2.7 !! 2.0 !! 15.2 !! 2
|}

References

External links

1998 births
Living people
Australian rules footballers from South Australia
Port Adelaide Football Club players
Port Adelaide Football Club players (all competitions)
Sydney Swans players
Papua New Guinean players of Australian rules football
VFL/AFL players born outside Australia